Novoť is a village and municipality in Námestovo District in the Žilina Region of northern Slovakia.

The beginnings of the village date back to 1691, it belonged to the Orava Castle. Initially, the village was known under the name Jurkov. In addition to agriculture, the population in the past was engaged in the cultivation of flax, the production of shingles and canvas, logging and the production of wooden dishes.

Novoť is one of the younger Zamagura municipalities, it was originally named after its founder Jurčákov. Trenches built by the German army before the end of World War II have been preserved in the cadastre of the village. There are 16 chapels, crosses and shrines in the village and in the village. Similar to Oravská Lesná and Zákamenné, the village is inhabited by scattered buildings. The road to Poland passes through the village, which enables the connection of Orava with Poland, Kysuce, but especially with the Czech Republic. The distance from the border to the D3 highway is only 27 km, to the Czech border 41 km. The hiking trail Pilsko-Babia hora passes through the cadastre of the village.

History
In historical records the village was first mentioned in 1691.

Geography
The municipality lies at an altitude of 752 metres and covers an area of 37.978 km2. It has a population of about 3653 people.

External links

Villages and municipalities in Námestovo District